Wyoming Highway 273 (WYO 273) is a short  north–south Wyoming State Road, known as County Club Road, located in south-central Niobrara County two miles west of Lusk.

Route description
At only  in length, Wyoming Highway 273 acts as a spur from US 18/US 20 north to the Lusk Municipal Golf Course, just west of Lusk.

Major intersections

References

Official 2003 State Highway Map of Wyoming

External links 

Wyoming State Routes 200-299
Lusk Municipal Golf Course
Lusk, Wyoming website

Transportation in Niobrara County, Wyoming
273
State highways in the United States shorter than one mile